Tazumal is a pre-Columbian archeological site in Chalchuapa, El Salvador. Tazumal is an architectural complex within the larger area of the ancient Mesoamerican city of Chalchuapa, in western El Salvador. The Tazumal group is located in the southern portion of the Chalchuapa archaeological zone. Archaeologist Stanley Boggs excavated and restored the Tazumal complex during the 1940s and 1950s.

Archaeological investigations indicate that Tazumal was inhabited from the Classic period through to the Postclassic and that the site had links as far afield as central Mexico, the northern Yucatán Peninsula and lower Central America. Metal artifacts from the complex date to the 8th century AD and are among the earliest metal artifacts reported from Mesoamerica.

Location
Tazumal is situated within the municipality of Chalchuapa in the department of Santa Ana, within the Río Paz drainage basin.

History

Chalchuapa was inhabited since the Preclassic period, when massive construction activity took place. This eruption caused a hiatus in construction activity at Tazumal that may have lasted several generations. Activity resumed during the Early to Middle Classic (c. AD 250-650) although the city never fully recovered to its Preclassic levels of activity. The Tazumal complex came closest to matching the enormous structures of the Preclassic period.

The principal structures of the Tazumal group date to the Classic period (c. AD 250-900) of Mesoamerican chronology. By the Late Classic (c. AD 600–900) Tazumal was an important ceremonial complex. Construction activity is evident from the Early Classic through to the Middle Classic (c. AD 400–600). At this time Tazumal had important links with the Maya city of Kaminaljuyu in the Valley of Guatemala, which acted to extend the influence of the powerful central Mexican city of Teotihuacan into the Pacific coastal areas of Guatemala and El Salvador. During the Late Classic Tazumal had links with Copán in Honduras, as evidenced by architecture, sculpture and ceramics at Tazumal. The ceramic sequence at Tazumal continues uninterrupted from the Classic period through to approximately AD 1200. A number of Early Classic features indicate links with Chichen Itza, in the northern Yucatán Peninsula, or with Tula in central Mexico.

The population of Tazumal coexisted with the Nahua-speaking Pipils from the Classic through to the Early Postclassic until at least AD 1200. The Pipil influence may have been due to trade with neighbouring Pipil populations rather than a direct Pipil presence, judging by the level of evidence.

After 1200, Tazumal was largely abandoned, with occupation shifting westwards towards the centre of what is now the modern town of Chalchuapa. Chalchuapa was still occupied at the time of the Spanish conquest, at which time its inhabitants were Poqomam Maya. The Pokomam are believed to have been relatively late settlers in Chalchuapa, postdating the Pipil influence that lasted until 1200.

Between 1942 and 1944 Stanley Boggs excavated and restored structures B1-1 and B1-2. This restoration included coating the structures with modern cement, which Boggs judged to be sufficiently similar to their original appearance as to justify its use. Boggs' final report was not made generally available and no further archaeological investigations were carried out until the early 21st century. In 1947 Tazumal was declared a National Historic Monument. Until 2001, the Salvadoran 100 colón note carried an illustration of the ruins of Tazumal. In 2004,  the side of Structure B1-2 collapsed and the Salvadoran Consejo Nacional para la Cultura y el Arte (CONCULTURA - National Council for Culture and Art) initiated operations to excavate and stabilise the ruins. During the first decade of the 21st century, two simultaneous archaeological projects were initiated, the investigation of Structure B1-2 by CONCULTURA and the Proyecto Arqueológico de El Salvador (PAES) by the Japanese University of Nagoya.

Site description
All the buildings in the Tazumal complex face west. Tazumal is believed to possess a Mesoamerican ballcourt; this is based upon the external appearance of two unexcavated mounds that are situated in the northwestern portion of the site, within a 20th-century cemetery. One of the mounds is badly damaged. Green obsidian  artefacts found at Tazumal indicate links with central Mexico.

Structure B1-1

Structure B1-1 is the principal structure in the Tazumal group and dominates the complex. The pyramid underwent various phases of construction through the Classic and Early Postclassic periods. Structure B1-1 was built upon a basal platform, called the Great Platform by Boggs, that measures  (east-west by north-south). The pyramid was surveyed in 2003–2004. These two side platforms were originally built as separate structures but were later incorporated into the Great Platform; it is presumed by investigators that the temple was radially symmetrical and that further platforms existed on the east and south sides. A test pit sunk into the presumed area of the southern platform uncovered an offering containing a cylindrical ceramic vessel with a polychrome bowl placed upon it like a lid. Within the vessel were two larger pieces of jade and 50 smaller jade fragments, a fragment of seashell and a fragment of snail shell, various pieces of animal bone, mica and traces of red pigment. The offering was covered with a slab of stone. The cylindrical vessel was decorated with two panels, each containing a personage wearing a headdress and performing autosacrifice.

Structure B1-1 is believed to have developed from a central temple and platforms on each side in the cardinal directions, with the west platforms serving as the main approach. As the complex developed, the space between the platforms was filled to form the Great Platform, the earliest version of which measured . The main pyramid B1-1 was then built upon the Great Platform, behind the western platform and covering the original central temple. The Great Platform was remodelled at least three times before it reached its final dimensions.

Temple of the Columns
The western platform of Structure B1-1 supports a superstructure, which has been called the Temple of the Columns. Because of the westward orientation of all the structures at Tazumal, the Temple of the Columns standing on the west side of the main pyramid may have served as its main facade. This structure had square columns and two identically sized chambers, separated by a space with two columns. The northern chamber had an entrance on the east side, with a possible additional entrance on the south side.

Structure B1-2

Structure B1-2 dates to the Late Classic. It is located to the southwest of the main pyramid B1-1. It is a west-facing pyramid with three stepped levels standing upon a low basal platform. In October 2004 the south side of the pyramid collapsed; this is believed to have been caused by a combination of damage caused by the roots of nearby trees and water damage. The restoration of the pyramid with cement in the 1950s had converted the structure into a water trap, while cedar roots had penetrated the building to a height of  causing significant cracking.

Structure B1-2 underwent four phases of construction. This first phase was completely covered by the second phase of construction, executed in three sub-phases (labelled 2A, 2B and 2C). This was built in a style very similar to that of the first phase, first with the extension of the lower two levels while still using the earlier top level; a new third level was added later, completely covering the previous version. During the third phase of construction, the structure was increased from four to five levels. The fourth and final construction phase was badly damaged by the collapse of the structure in 2004.

Other structures
Structure B1-3 and Structure B1-4 are the two structures that comprise the ballcourt. Test pits excavated during the first decade of the 21st century found the mortar floor of an I-shaped ballcourt.

Structure B1-8 is a circular platform dating to the Late Classic period.

Sculpture

Sculpture at the site dates as far back as the Preclassic period. Two Terminal Classic to Early Postclassic chacmool sculptures were recovered from Tazumal, as well as a jaguar effigy sculpture and an anthropomorphic sculpture depicting the central Mexican deity Xipe Totec. These artefacts are stylistically similar to artefacts from central Mexico and the northern Yucatán Peninsula. One of the crude chacmool sculptures is housed in the Museo Nacional de Antropología in San Salvador; the other is in private ownership.

Metal artifacts
Three gold ornaments have been excavated from Tazumal. They were created using the lost wax method and have been tentatively dated to the 8th century AD; their presence indicates contacts with lower Central America. These, together with some contemporary metal artefacts from Copán, are among the earliest reported metal artefacts from Mesoamerica. These items were recovered from a Late Classic tomb and at least one item was a traded artefact from the Isthmus of Tehuantepec.

Burials
According to anecdotal evidence from workers who excavated the area of the presumed eastern platform of B1-1, many burials were found in that area. However, these were not mentioned by Boggs in any of his excavation reports.

Burial 1 was found interred  under the ledge joining the first and second levels of Pyramid B1-2. The burial consisted of a lower jaw and the remains of several other bones, accompanied by ceramic fragments and some obsidian artefacts. The dispersed remains indicate that Burial 1 was a secondary burial, possibly that of a human sacrifice associated with the dedication of the final phase of the pyramid. The teeth indicate that the remains were those of a young adult; the associated ceramics date the burial to the Terminal Classic or Early Postclassic.

Burial 2 was found under the western facade of Structure B1-2. Its dating is uncertain but it is believed to be associated with the final phase of construction and contemporaneous with Burial 1. The burial consisted of many bone fragments, including skull, longbones, ribs, jaw and vertebrae. The teeth indicate that the remains were those of a child. The remains were accompanied by ceramic pieces and some ashes. The ashes were subjected to radiocarbon dating, which indicated a date in the Late Classic to Early Postclassic, between AD 770 and 1000.

Notes

References

Further reading

Tourist attractions in El Salvador
Pyramids in El Salvador
Archaeological sites in El Salvador
Maya sites in El Salvador
Former populated places in El Salvador
Santa Ana Department
Pipil
Maya sites that survived the end of the Classic Period